Thomas Kingston Critchley,  (27 January 1916 – 14 July 2009) was an Australian public servant, diplomat, author and journalist.

Early life and education
Critchley was born in Melbourne but grew up at Longueville in Sydney and attended North Sydney Boys High School. He joined the Rural Bank after completing high school and attended the University of Sydney by night to study economics.

Career
After the Second World War, Critchley joined the Department of External Affairs as the head of the economic relations section. His first diplomatic role with the department was assisting Australia's representation of Indonesia against the Dutch during the Indonesian National Revolution. He was on the United Nations Commission for Indonesia between 1947 and 1950 and played a role securing Indonesia's independence from the Dutch.

Critchley served as Australian High Commissioner to Malaysia (1955–1965); Ambassador to Thailand (1969–1973); High Commissioner to Papua New Guinea (1974–1978); and Ambassador to Indonesia (1978–1981).

Family and personal life

Critchley's first marriage,  to an English Foreign Office employee posted to New Delhi, Joyce Gwendolyn Hew, took place on 9 January 1946 in Delhi. The marriage was witnessed by High Commissioner to India Colin Moodie. Mrs Joyce Critchley followed her husband to Australia in May 1946. Critchley continued to live in single men's quarters in Canberra, Australia, while his wife stayed with his parents in Sydney. Mrs Joyce Critchley filed for divorce on grounds of desertion [Divorce case no. 1026 of 1953, Supreme Court of New South Wales]. Decree Nisi was pronounced on 19 February 1954. Alimony of six pounds sterling a week was granted on 25 February 1955. Mrs Critchley returned to live in the United Kingdom. She rejoined the British Foreign Office in 1950 and was posted to Beirut [Affidavit dated 15 September in the divorce proceedings 1026 of 1953].  

Critchley, a keen surfer, golfer and tennis player, who also played piano, died on 14 July 2009, survived by his wife Susan and their four daughters.

Critchley's daughter, Laurie Critchley, is a television producer.

References

1916 births
2009 deaths
Ambassadors of Australia to Indonesia
Ambassadors of Australia to Thailand
High Commissioners of Australia to Malaysia
High Commissioners of Australia to Papua New Guinea
Australian Commanders of the Order of the British Empire
Officers of the Order of Australia
People educated at North Sydney Boys High School
Australian Army personnel of World War II
Australian Army officers
Royal Australian Air Force personnel of World War II
Royal Australian Air Force airmen